Counter Culture Coffee is a Durham, North Carolina based coffee roasting company founded in 1995. It has regional training locations in Asheville, NC; Atlanta; Boston; Charleston, SC; Chicago; Durham, NC; Emeryville, CA; New York City; Philadelphia; and Washington D.C. Counter Culture training centers provide education in the fundamentals of preparing and serving coffee and serve as classrooms and event spaces. Training centers are not only for vendors of Counter Culture Coffee, but are also available to anyone  that is interested in the production of coffee. Training centers also host competition training, food events with guest chefs, and professional workshops.

Counter Culture Coffee buys primarily from small coffee producers at prices between $1.30 and $25 a pound. As such, they are regarded as a "boutique" coffee roaster, a company which sources from multiple small estates and cooperatives rather than a single large grower.

Company history
Counter Culture Coffee first started roasting coffee in Durham in 1995. Founded by Brett Smith and Fred Houk, their main focus was creating custom coffee blends for some of Durham and Chapel Hill's southern restaurants. They sold their first coffee to Pop's Restaurant in Durham in 1995. The company has  expanded its operations to areas along the East Coast. The firm has also  diversified their line of products and services, offering seasonal coffee selections and educational programs that focus on sustainability and the coffee brewing process.

Sustainability
Counter Culture Coffee directly collaborates with artisans who grow the coffee and their partnership with farmers is a basis for their sustainable coffee model which involves working with progressive and environmentally sensitive farms in the  trade. In 2008, they launched a third-party Counter Culture Direct Trade Certification, which established direct trade standards for sustainability, quality, and fairness in the coffee chain. Additional  initiatives include their Sustaining Educational and Environmental Development at a Source (SEEDS) program and the company's Sustainability Scorecard. The SEEDS initiative aims to support sustainability and education for the origins of the products while the Sustainability Scorecard is used to measure the impact the company's efforts toward building a more sustainable supply chain.

Education
The firm also  provides consumers, its employees, and its wholesale partners  with  educational programs  on coffee brewing, origin, and history.   Professional development courses offered include topics such as Brewing Science, Barista Fundamentals, Coffee Origins, Cupping Fundamentals, and Brewing: Technique & Troubleshooting. Public educational initiatives include free "Tastings at Ten" every Friday morning, as well as home brew labs for coffee enthusiasts offered at a fee.  Educational courses are offered at  thirteen Counter Culture Training Centers across the country.

Locations
Coffee is roasted in two production facilities in Durham, NC (also the company's headquarters) and Emeryville, CA.

See also 

 Blue Bottle Coffee
 Intelligentsia Coffee & Tea
 La Colombe Coffee Roasters
 Revelator Coffee
 Stumptown Coffee Roasters
 List of coffeehouse chains
 List of coffee companies

References

External links
Counter Culture Website

Coffee companies of the United States
1995 establishments in North Carolina
Tea companies of the United States
Companies based in Durham, North Carolina
Fair trade organizations
Coffeehouses and cafés in the United States